Javier Neves Mujica (Lima, Peru, 1953 – 11 February 2021) was a Peruvian politician who served as Minister of Labor and Promotion of Employment from 2004 to 2005. He died of COVID-19 in Lima during the COVID-19 pandemic in Peru.

References

1953 births
2021 deaths
Government ministers of Peru
Deaths from the COVID-19 pandemic in Peru
People from Lima
Date of birth missing